Puma Apachita (Aymara and Quechua puma cougar, puma, apachita the place of transit of an important pass in the principal routes of the Andes; a stone cairn, a little pile of rocks built along the trail in the high mountains, also spelled Puma Apacheta) is a mountain in the Tunari mountain range of the Bolivian Andes, about  high. It is situated in the Cochabamba Department, Quillacollo Province, Quillacollo Municipality, northwest of Cochabamba. Puma Apachita lies southeast of Jatun Q'asa.

See also 
 Tunari

References 

Mountains of Cochabamba Department